The 2015 Bassetlaw District Council election took place on 7 May 2015, to elect all 48 members of Bassetlaw District Council in England. This was on the same day as the 2015 general election and other local elections.

Prior to this election, the council decided to move to all-out elections from 2015. Previously, the council had been elected by thirds with district elections being held every year except the year in which elections to Nottinghamshire County Council were held in the area. Councillors elected at this election will serve a four-year term and face re-election in 2019.

Result
The election resulted in the Labour Party retaining its control of the council.

Ward results

Beckingham

Blyth

Carlton

Clayworth

East Markham

East Retford East

East Retford North

East Retford South

East Retford West

Everton

Harworth

Langold

Misterton

Rampton

Ranskill

Sturton

Sutton

Tuxford and Trent

Welbeck

Worksop East

Worksop North

Worksop North East

Worksop North West

Worksop South

Worksop South East

References

2015 English local elections
May 2015 events in the United Kingdom
2015
2010s in Nottinghamshire